"War" is a song by Canadian rock band Sum 41. It was released as the lead single from the album 13 Voices on August 25, 2016.

Background
The song was released as a single, along with accompanying music video, on August 25, 2016, through the official channel of YouTube, Hopeless Records. It is the first single from the band since the return of guitarist Dave Baksh in 2015 and the departure of former drummer Steve Jocz, who left the group in 2013. Frank Zummo, who replaces Jocz, makes his debut with this single.

Music video
The song's music video was released through the Hopeless Records official YouTube channel, on August 24, 2016. It was directed by Djay Brawner.

Charts

Release history

References

External links

2016 singles
2016 songs
Sum 41 songs
Rock ballads
Songs written by Deryck Whibley